Tine Ladefoged Pedersen (born August 6, 1977) is a former Danish handballer who among other clubs played for Horsens HK. She stopped her active career in 2005 when she was 27 years. She has played 27 national games and scored 72 goals.

External links 
 Player stats, Danish Handball Federation 
 About Tine Ladefoged European Handball Federation
 Tine Ladefoged stops career, haandbold.com 

1977 births
Living people
Danish female handball players